"Just in Case" is a song written by Hugh Moffatt, and recorded by American country music artist Ronnie Milsap.  It was released in October 1975 as the second single from his album Night Things.  The song reached number 4 on the Billboard Hot Country Singles chart.  The song was also covered by fellow artist Barbara Mandrell that same year on her album This Is Barbara Mandrell.

Chart performance

References

1975 singles
1975 songs
Barbara Mandrell songs
Ronnie Milsap songs
Songs written by Hugh Moffatt
Song recordings produced by Tom Collins (record producer)
RCA Records singles